The 1930 Monza Grand Prix was a Grand Prix motor race held at the Autodromo Nazionale di Monza on 7 September 1930. There were four 14-lap heats (separated by class), a 7-lap repêchage, and a 35-lap final, which was won by Achille Varzi in a Maserati. His teammates, Luigi Arcangeli and Ernesto Maserati, completed the podium.

Entries

1500 cc to 2000 cc

2000 cc to 3000 cc

Over 3000 cc

Up to 1100 cc

Heat 1 (1500 cc to 2000 cc)

Starting grid

Classification

 Positions 1-4 progressed to the final; positions 5-8 were eligible for the repêchage.

Heat 2 (2000 cc to 3000 cc)

Starting grid

Classification

 Philippe Étancelin and Heinrich Joachim von Morgen were entered in this class, but raced in Heat 1 instead;
 Positions 1-4 progressed to the final; positions 5-8 were eligible for the repêchage.

Heat 3 (over 3000 cc)

Starting grid

Classification

 Positions 1-4 progressed to the final; position 5 was eligible for the repêchage.

Repêchage

Starting grid

Classification

 Positions 1-2 progressed to the final.

Heat 4 (voiturettes - up to 1100 cc)

Starting grid

Classification

 Positions 1-2 progressed to the final.

Final

Starting grid

 — Philippe Étancelin (Bugatti), Luigi Fagioli (Maserati), Baconin Borzacchini (Alfa Romeo), and José Scaron (Amilcar) all started from the third row of the grid, but their specific positions are unknown.

Classification

References

Monza
Monza Grand Prix
Monza Grand Prix